Stojanović is a South Slavic surname derived from the South Slavic masculine given name Stojan. Stojanović is the sixth most frequent surname in Serbia, and is also common in Croatia, with 2,798 carriers (2011 census).

Geographical distribution
As of 2014, 78.9% of all known bearers of the surname Stojanović were residents of Serbia (frequency 1:139), 10.4% of Bosnia and Herzegovina (1:524), 3.3% of Kosovo (1:864), 3.0% of Montenegro (1:322), 3.0% of Croatia (1:2,197) and 1.4% of the Republic of Macedonia (1:2,362).

In Serbia, the frequency of the surname was higher than national average (1:139) in the following districts:
 1. Jablanica District (1:30)
 2. Pčinja District (1:48)
 3. Nišava District (1:52)
 4. Toplica District (1:59)
 5. Pirot District (1:71)
 6. Zaječar District (1:72)
 7. Pomoravlje District (1:78)
 8. Braničevo District (1:95)
 9. Podunavlje District (1:98)
 10. Bor District (1:99)

People
Anđelija Stojanović (born 1987), Serbian chess grandmaster
Aleksandar Stojanović (born 1954), Serbian football goalkeeping manager and former goalkeeper
Boban Stojanović (footballer) (born 1979), Serbian football striker
Dalibor Stojanović (born 1989), Slovenian football midfielder/striker
Danijel Stojanović (born 1984), Croatian football player
Dejan Stojanović (born 1959), Serbian-American poet, writer, essayist, philosopher, businessman, and former journalist
Dejan Stojanović (footballer) (born 1993), football goalkeeper from the Republic of Macedonia
Djordje Stojanović (table tennis), Captained Swiss table tennis team, leading them to victory in multiple cups
Filip Stojanović (born 1988), Serbian football player
Goran Stojanović (born 1977), Montenegrin handball player for VfL Gummersbach
Ivan Stojanović (1829–1900), Catholic priest who wrote the book 'Dubrovacka literature' (1900)
Ljubiša Stojanović (born 1952), Serbian singer born in Leskovac
Ljubomir Stojanović (1860–1930), Serbian statesman, politician, philologist and academic
Mijat Stojanović (1818–1881), Croatian educator, ethnographer and folk writer
Mike Stojanović (born 1947), retired NASL and Canadian international soccer forward
Milan Stojanović (goalkeeper), Yugoslavian football goalkeeper
Milan Stojanović (midfielder) (born 1988), Serbian football player
Milka Stojanović (born 1937), Serbian soprano opera singer
Miloš Stojanović (born 1984), Serbian footballer who plays as a striker
Mirko Stojanović (born 1939), former Croatian footballer
Mladen Stojanović (1896–1942), doctor and Yugoslav national hero from Prijedor
Mladen Stojanović "Čakr-paša" (fl. 1876–85), Serbian brigand and rebel
Nenad Stojanović (born 1979), Serbian football player
Nina Stojanović (born 1996), Serbian tennis player
Petar Stojanović (composer) (1877–1957), Serbian violinist and composer of operettas, ballets and orchestral music
Petar Stojanović (footballer) (born 1995), Slovenian footballer
Radoslav Stojanović, PhD, a professor of law at University of Belgrade
Saša Stojanović (born 1983), footballer from Serbia
Slaviša Stojanović (born 1989), Serbian football midfielder
Slavko Stojanović (born 1930), former Croatian football goalkeeper
Sreten Stojanović (1898–1960), one of the most prominent Bosnian and Serbian sculptors of the 20th century
Stefan Stojanović (born 1988), Serbian football midfielder
Stefan Stojanović (born 1992), Serbian football forward
Stevan Stojanović (born 1964), retired Serbian Football (soccer) goalkeeper
Stevan Stojanović Mokranjac (1856–1914), nineteenth century Serbian composer and music educator
Suzana Stojanović (born 1969), contemporary Serbian Hyperrealist painter
Sven Stojanovic (born 1969), Swedish director of Serbian origin mostly involved with Swedish TV productions
Svetozar Stojanović (1931–2010), Serbian philosopher and political theorist
 Traian Stoianovich (1920–2005), Serbian-American historian
Vesna Stojanović, Serbian former football striker

See also
Stojanovski, variant used in R. Macedonia
Stojković
Stojačić
Stojmenović
Stojić

References 

Serbian surnames
Croatian surnames
Patronymic surnames
Surnames from given names

de:Stojanović
ru:Стоянович